Congleton is a surname. Notable people with the surname include:

John Congleton (born 1977), American record producer, engineer, mixer, and writer
Jerome T. Congleton (1876–1936), American politician
Roger D. Congleton (born 1951), American economist